Indi Assembly seat is one of 224 assembly constituencies in Karnataka State, in India. It is part of Bijapur (Lok Sabha constituency).

Assembly Members

Bombay State (Indi Sindgi Constituency)
 1951 (Seat-1): Surpur Mallappa Karabasappa, Indian National Congress
 1951 (Seat-2): Jattappa Laxman Kabadi, Indian National Congress

Mysore State (Indi Constituency)
 1957 (Seat-1): Surpur Mallappa Karabasappa, Indian National Congress

 1957 (Seat-2): Jattappa Laxman Kabadi, Indian National Congress

 1962: Gurulingappa Devappa Patil, Swatantra Party

 1967: Surpur Mallappa Karabasappa, Swatantra Party

 1972: Surpur Mallappa Karabasappa, Indian National Congress

Karnataka State (Indi Constituency)
 1978:	Kallur Revanasiddappa Ramagondappa, Janata Party

 1983:	Kallur Revanasiddappa Ramagondappa, Indian National Congress

 1985:	Ningappa Siddappa Khed, Janata Party

 1989:	Kallur Revanasiddappa Ramagondappa, Indian National Congress

 1994:	Patil Ravikant Shankareppa, Independent

 1999:	Patil Ravikant Shankareppa, Independent

 2004:	Patil Ravikant Shankareppa, Independent

 2008:	Sarvabhouma Satagouda Bagali, Bharatiya Janata Party

 2013:	Yashavantarayagouda Viitalagouda Patil, Indian National Congress

 2018: Yashavantarayagouda Viitalagouda Patil, Indian National Congress

Also see
List of constituencies of the Karnataka Legislative Assembly

References

Assembly constituencies of Karnataka
Bijapur district, Karnataka